John Grieve may refer to:

John Grieve (VC) (1821–1863), Scottish recipient of the Victoria Cross award for gallantry
John Grieve (actor) (1924–2003), Scottish actor
John Grieve (poet) (1781–1836), Scottish poet
John Grieve (politician) (1852–1920),  English-born farmer, manufacturer and political figure in Ontario
John Grieve (police officer) (born 1946), British retired police officer and university professor
John Grieve (physician) (1753-1805) Scottish physician to the Russian royal family.
John Grieve (Lord Provost) (d.1803), lord provost of Edinburgh
John Grieve (footballer) (1879–1942), Australian rules footballer for St Kilda

See also
John Greaves (disambiguation)